Everybody Up is an album by the Ohio Players. Released in 1979, it was their only album for Arista Records.

Production
The band added two percussionists prior to the recording of the album. All of the tracks were written and produced by the Ohio Players.

Critical reception
The Oakland Post wrote that "the moment the needle hits the opening notes of the scorching 'Everybody Up', it's clear that their Arista Records debut finds them ready for action, ready to take [their] rightful place among class players from any state." Billboard praised the "tight, basic sound, unencumbered by overwrought string and horn arrangements."

Track listing

Side 1
"Everybody Up" (9:32)
"Don't Say Goodbye" (5:45)
"Make Me Feel" (6:45)

Side 2
"Say It" (7:01)
"Take De Funk Off, Fly" (6:04)	
"Something Special" (4:45)

Charts

Singles

References

External links
 Everybody Up at Discogs

1979 albums
Arista Records albums
Ohio Players albums